Clymer is a borough in Indiana County, Pennsylvania, United States. The population was 1,336 at the 2020 census.  The community was named after William Bingham Clymer, grandson of George Clymer, one of the signers of the United States Declaration of Independence. William Clymer sold the land the borough is situated on to Thomas White (Namesake of  White Township) in the 1830s. Most of Clymer's family died in a tragic sea accident in 1878, which made national news and inspired the name. It is surrounded by but separate from Cherryhill Township.

Geography
Clymer is located at  (40.668977, -79.011925).

Demographics

At the 2000 census there were 1,547 people in 679 households, including 418 families, in the borough. The population density was 2,606.6 people per square mile (1,012.4/km²). There were 734 housing units at an average density of 1,236.8 per square mile (480.3/km²).  The racial makeup of the borough was 99.55% White, 0.19% Native American, 0.06% Asian, 0.06% from other races, and 0.13% from two or more races. Hispanic or Latino of any race were 0.19%.

There were 679 households, 27.0% had children under the age of 18 living with them, 44.9% were married couples living together, 12.5% had a female householder with no husband present, and 38.3% were non-families. 35.1% of households were made up of individuals, and 21.6% were one person aged 65 or older. The average household size was 2.28 and the average family size was 2.97.

The age distribution was 22.9% under the age of 18, 7.4% from 18 to 24, 27.1% from 25 to 44, 21.6% from 45 to 64, and 20.9% 65 or older. The median age was 39 years. For every 100 females there were 81.6 males. For every 100 females age 18 and over, there were 76.3 males.

The median household income was $24,688 and the median family income was $36,688. Males had a median income of $29,375 versus $25,000 for females. The per capita income for the borough was $14,250. About 14.5% of families and 16.5% of the population were below the poverty line, including 21.6% of those under age 18 and 15.9% of those age 65 or over.

References

External links
 Borough website
 Fire department

Populated places established in 1905
Boroughs in Indiana County, Pennsylvania
1905 establishments in Pennsylvania